Air Commodore Muhammad Mahmood Alam  (Bengali: মহম্মদ মাহমুদ আলম) 6 July 1935 – 18 March 2013) was a Pakistani Muhajir fighter pilot officially credited by the Pakistan Air Force with having downed Six Indian jets under a minute.
 
He was a F-86 Sabre flying ace as per Pakistan Air Force records. He was awarded the Sitara-e-Jurat twice, the nation's third highest military award for his actions.

Early life
Alam born on 6 July 1935 to a family hailing from Calcutta, British India. Born and raised in Bengal, Alam was a fluent Bengali speaker, it being his mother tongue. He was of mixed heritage: his maternal line was of Bengali origin and his paternal line was of Bihari origin, having migrated from Patna and later settled in the Bengal province of British India for a long time. His family migrated from Calcutta to East Bengal (which later became East Pakistan and then Bangladesh) following the creation of Pakistan in 1947. It was in East Pakistan where Alam completed his secondary education, graduating from the Government High School in Dhaka in 1951. He joined the then Royal Pakistani Air Force (now Pakistan Air Force) in 1952, being commissioned on 2 October 1953. Alam's brothers are M. Shahid Alam, an economist and a professor at Northeastern University, and M. Sajjad Alam, who was a particle physicist at SUNY Albany.

His family moved to West Pakistan in 1971, after the liberation of Bangladesh. Being the eldest of his 11 siblings, Alam did not marry as he had to assume the responsibilities of the upbringing of his family. Some of his younger brothers became distinguished in various academic careers.

Service with the Pakistan Air Force

Indo-Pakistani War of 1965 

During the Indo-Pakistani War of 1965, Alam claimed to have scored an "ace in a day" on 7 September 1965, with a total of 5 kills. His actions have placed him at the top of the hall of fame list at the Pakistan Air Force (PAF) Museum in Karachi. During the war, he was posted at Sargodha.

According to the PAF, in a single sortie on 7 September 1965, Alam downed five aircraft in less than a minute, establishing a world record.  Regarding the last four, he stated: "Before we had completed more than about 270 degrees of turn, at around 12 degrees per second, all four Hunters had been shot down." In 1978, when he gave a speech at a Karachi university, he said that he saw a spiritual force coming from the sky.

His claims have been contested by retired PAF Air Commodore Sajad S. Haider and the Indian Air Force, which denied losing five Hawker Hunter aircraft on the said day, Also, the fact that no verifiable gun camera footage of his kills was ever made public by the Pakistani authorities, further casts doubt on his claim.

Later years 
In 1967, he was appointed Squadron Commander of the first squadron of Dassault Mirage III fighters procured by the PAF. In 1982, he retired as an Air commodore and took up residence in Karachi.

Death
Alam was admitted to Pakistan Naval Station Shifa Hospital in Karachi where he died on 18 March 2013, aged 77. He was being treated for respiratory problems for 18 months. Alam's funeral prayer was performed at the PAF Base Masroor, where he served some of the significant years of his career. Alam was buried at the Shuhuda (Martyrs) Graveyard, located at PAF Masroor Airbase. Air Chief Marshal Tahir Rafique Butt, Sindh Governor Dr Ishratul Ebad, Air Chief Marshal (Ret.) Farooq Feroze Khan, Sindh corps commander Lt. Gen Ijaz Chaudhry, Pakistan Rangers (Sindh) Director-General Maj. Gen. Rizwan Akhtar, Base Commander PAF Base Masroor Air Commodore Usaid ur Rehman, many war veterans of the 1965 war and Alam's closest colleagues attended the funeral. One of the younger brothers of the deceased, Zubair Alam, was also present.

Memorials
M. M. Alam Road, a major road in Lahore, Punjab, Pakistan is named in honour of the flying ace of Pakistan Air Force, Air Commodore Muhammad Mahmood Alam, running from Main Market to Gulberg. The road runs parallel to famous Main Boulevard thus providing an alternate route and is a commercial hub with many restaurants, fashion boutiques, shopping malls, beauty saloons and décor stores. M.M. Alam Road hosts a variety of flamboyant restaurants in modern Lahore. On 20 March 2014, on account of his first death anniversary, the PAF Airbase Mianwali was renamed after him as PAF Base M.M. Alam.

Awards and decorations

See also
 Aviators who became ace in a day
 8-Pass Charlie
 Saiful Azam
 Manuel J. Fernandez

Notes

References

Further reading
 History of PAF – Government of Pakistan
 "Laying the Sargodha Ghost to rest." Vayu Aerospace Review. November 1985

1989 births
2013 deaths
Disputed flying aces
Pakistan Air Force officers
Pakistani flying aces
Pilots of the Indo-Pakistani War of 1965
Recipients of Sitara-e-Jurat
Military personnel from Karachi
Military personnel from Kolkata
Pakistani aviation record holders
People from Dhaka
Pakistani people of Bihari descent
Pakistani test pilots
Pakistani Muslims